2nd Zirimzibash (2-se Yeremyäbaş) is a rural locality (a village) in Kurdymsky Selsoviet of Tatyshlinsky District, Russia. The population was 151 as of 2010.

Geography 
2nd Zirimzibash is located 28 km west of Verkhniye Tatyshly (the district's administrative centre) by road. Stary Kurdym is the nearest rural locality.

Ethnicity 
The village is inhabited by Bashkirs.

Streets 
 Molodezhnaya
 Tsentralnaya

References

External links 
 2nd Zirimzibash on komandirovka.ru
 Council of Municipalities of the Republic of Bashkortostan

Rural localities in Tatyshlinsky District